David Pichler (born September 3, 1968) is an American Olympic diver representing the United States in 1996 Summer Olympics in Atlanta and in the 2000 Summer Olympics in Sydney, where Pichler was elected team captain. 
Pichler and Mark Ruiz won the synchronized platform final at the FINA-USA Diving Grand Prix in May 2000 scored 301.26 points, ahead of 298.50 for Australians Mathew Helm and Robert Newbery. Pichler attended Butler Senior High School and The Ohio State University. In 1996 he publicly came out as gay.

References
 David Pichler Biography and Statistics on Sports-reference
 Gay Swimmers David Pichler page

1968 births
Olympic divers of the United States
Divers at the 1996 Summer Olympics
Divers at the 2000 Summer Olympics
American LGBT sportspeople
Living people
Gay sportsmen
LGBT divers
American male divers
21st-century LGBT people